Heinrich Tillessen (27 November 1894 – 12 November 1984) was one of the murderers of Matthias Erzberger, former German minister of finance of the Centre Party. The other accomplice in the crime was Heinrich Schulz. The trial of Heinrich Tillessen was held in postwar Germany, and received widespread attention from the public and from legal experts, exemplifying numerous problems in the judicial processing of crimes committed before and during the Nazi period.

Youth
The father of Heinrich Tillessen was an artillery officer. His mother Karoline was Dutch. He grew up with ten siblings (three brothers and seven sisters) in Cologne, Metz, and Koblenz - the garrison locations of his father. One of his brothers was Admiral Werner Tillessen. The family was considered strictly Catholic. When the father retired in 1904, the family moved to Koblenz.

Military
Following the death of his father and mother (1910 and 1911), Heinrich Tillessen left school and joined the Imperial German Navy as a midshipman on 1 April 1912. On 12 April 1914, he was promoted to Fähnrich zur See, and to Leutnant zur See on 22 March 1915.

During the First World War he first did service as a deck officer on smaller units. On 13 July 1917 he was transferred to the 17th Torpedo Boat Division, where he was employed under the commander Hermann Ehrhardt as watch on the leading boat. It was then when he was impressed by Ehrhardt  as an energetic and charismatic officer. As part of the extradition of the German navy, he led as commander a torpedo boat to Scapa Flow. After the scuttling of the fleet there, he had to remain in English captivity in 1920 until the end of July. On 30 July 1920 he was dismissed from the Navy at his own request.

Murder of Matthias Erzberger
Heinrich Tillessen failed to get a foothold in a civilian job. By then, the dissolution of the Ehrhardt Brigade had already been ordered on 29 February 1920. Heinrich Tillessen joined the successor group in Munich, which was also led by Hermann Ehrhardt. The stated goal was the implementation of assassinations. 

The chief of operations in the Munich headquarters was Manfred von Killinger, also a former torpedo boat commander. From him Heinrich Tillessen and Heinrich Schulz received in August 1921 the personal mission to assassinate Erzberger. On 26 August 1921 in the morning the two ambushed Erzberger, who was walking there with his party colleague Carl Diez, in a lonely place in the Black Forest near Bad Griesbach. The perpetrators fired a number of pistol shots and injured both seriously. Erzberger tried to escape downhill, but collapsed after 10 meters. The perpetrators went after him, and murdered him with head shots at close range.

Escape
The perpetrators initially went back to Munich. However, the investigators were able to determine their identity very quickly, setting off a search warrant with pictures of the perpetrators. These left Munich on 31 August 1921. Heinrich Tillessen initially hid in the Alps, then moved over Salzburg to the Burgenland. In November and December 1921, both perpetrators lived under assumed names in Budapest. A request by Germany for extradition was rejected by Hungary due to the absence of an Agreement of Extradition. Equipped by his political friends in Germany with a false German passport, Tillessen went to Spain at the end of 1925. In Madrid he found work and for years lived in a modest middle-class background. He avoided contact with other Germans.

Return and second time in the military
In December 1932, Heinrich Tillessen returned to Germany and took refuge with his siblings in Cologne. On 30 January 1933 Adolf Hitler was appointed chancellor. Already on 21 March 1933 President Paul von Hindenburg signed the so-called  (i. e. Impunity Regulation) of 1933. As a consequence of this decree all nationalist political murderers of preceding years were granted an amnesty. Tillessen did not have to hide any longer. He found work again, married and lived in Düsseldorf, Mannheim, and Heidelberg. On 4 September 1939 Tillessen was drafted into the military service, but declared incapable for service on board shortly after. He spent the Second World War on land in the service of the German Admiralty and was released in late 1944 in the rank of Corvette captain. He returned to his family in Heidelberg.

Arrest and First Trial
In Heidelberg Heinrich Tillessen was arrested on 4 May 1945 by the American military police and interrogated. He voluntarily confessed to being an accomplice in Erzberger's murder. Heinrich Tillessen remained in custody. On 15 August 1945, a formal arrest warrant was issued. 
On 13 May 1946 Tillessen was transferred to Freiburg im Breisgau to answer before the competent Baden court. District Court) Offenburg to proceedings before the Criminal Chamber was filed. 

The board, however, by order of 10 September 1946 rejected the opening of the trial. In their view there was impunity by the Impunity Regulation of 1933. The competent chamber of the Court of Appeal on 30 September 1946 overturned the order of 10 September 1946 and ordered the opening of the trial. The trial took place in November 1946. The prosecution called for the death penalty, the defence for acquittal, citing the Impunity Regulation of 1933. However, the chamber of the court did not follow the reasoning of the prosecution: By verdict announced on 29 November 1946 by Chamber chairman Rudolf Goering (1883-), Tillessen was acquitted. Specifically, the Court pointed out that it considered that the Impunity Regulation of 1933 was applicable. The Prosecution immediately appealed, thereby preventing the res judicata effect of the judgement.

However, the French occupation organs reacted most consistently: Heinrich Tillessen was intercepted by the French secret service on the date of release from custody, brought to France and interned there. 

The French  headquartered in Rastatt near Baden-Baden as the supreme court for all civil matters in Baden decided to attract the case. Two dates were set: 23 December 1946 for the trial, and 6 January 1947 for the rendition of judgement.

The judgement of the  Offenburg was repealed and the proceeding for a new hearing at the district court in Konstanz ordered under the condition that the Impunity Regulation of 1933 should no longer be applied because it had not been passed in accordance with the regulations of the Weimar Constitution then in effect.

The second trial was held from 25 to 28 February 1947 in Konstanz chaired by District Court Director Anton Henneka. The prosecution called for the death penalty, the defense now pleaded - to avoid that - to manslaughter. The court found Heinrich Tillessen guilty of murder and crimes against humanity under Control Council Law no. 10. The sentence was 15 years of imprisonment. This judgement was final.

Pardon
Soon after the verdict, Tillessen's wife and the defence petitioned for clemency. In May 1952 Heinrich Tillessen received bail, and in December 1952, the remainder of the sentence was suspended. Later on, in March 1958, the sentence was abrogated on clemency. The widow of Matthias Erzberger had argued for pardon.

Heinrich Tillessen again found work, lived in Heidelberg and Frankfurt and in old age, in Koblenz. He died at the age of 89.

Literature
Cord Gebhardt: Der Fall des Erzberger-Mörders Heinrich Tillessen. Ein Beitrag zur Justizgeschichte nach 1945. Mohr, Tübingen 1995 (Beiträge zur Rechtsgeschichte des 20. Jahrhunderts, Band 14), .
Reiner Haehling von Lanzenauer: Der Mord an Matthias Erzberger. Verlag der Gesellschaft für Kulturhistorische Dokumentation, Karlsruhe 2008 (Schriftenreihe des Rechtshistorischen Museums Karlsruhe, Band 14). .
Edith Raim: Justiz zwischen Diktatur und Demokratie : Wiederaufbau und Ahndung von NS-Verbrechen in Westdeutschland 1945 - 1949.  Oldenbourg, München 2013, . (Zugl.: Augsburg, Univ., Habil.-Schr., 2012).

References

1894 births
1984 deaths
20th-century Freikorps personnel
German assassins
Kapp Putsch participants
Nazi Party members
Organisation Consul members
Sturmabteilung personnel
German people of Dutch descent
Kriegsmarine personnel
People from Cologne